Colonel Fillipus Amutenya "Zulu" Nandenga (3 March 1943 – 11 April 2021) was a Namibian military officer whose military career began in South West African Liberational Army (SWALA) the forerunner to People's Liberation Army of Namibia PLAN.

Early life
In 1958 he joined the contract labour system and found a paying job at a fish tinning factory in Walvis Bay and was employed there for five years until 1963. Nandenga joined Ovamboland Peoples Organisation in 1958. In 1964 due to his political conviction he fled South West Africa through Bechuanaland  and lived in Francistown for a period of one year and a half joining other cadres in exile such as Nahas Angula, Helmut Angula, Nangolo Mbumba. In 1966 he was then sent to Zambia.

PLAN career 
In 1967 he was sent to Tanganyika. He was then sent to North Korea between 1967 and 1968. After completing his military training he was then deployed to the Eastern front in Zambia from 1969 to 1972 as Commander of Group "A" whilst Group "B" was under the command of Matias Ndakolo. On the eastern front he fought the South African forces and the Portuguese forces. In late 1973 Jason Amutenya "Wanehepo" Ndandi  during which unit "A" and "B" assembled and informed that a new front would be opened up in Southern Angola that would be known as the northern front and that volunteers were needed for the risky mission knowing that Portuguese forces were still present in Angola. After Matias "Mbulunganga" Ndakolo stepped forward, Nandenga also stepped forward to volunteer. This group of seventeen fighters would leave Zambia into Angola with Mbulunganga as their commander and "Zulu" was appointed the political commissar. The seventeen fighters were Matias "Mbulunganga" Ndakolo; commander, Fillipus "Zulu" Nandenga; political commissar, Elia Haulyondjaba "Hailonga"; Advisor to Commander, Wilbard "Nakada" Tashiya, Isack "Pondo" Shikongo; Commander Reconnaissance, John "Kalola" Hamukoto; 2nd Reconnaissance commander, Linus "Mawila" Hamwele, Ismael "Ngiringiri" Kamati, Erickson "Kapanya" Hauwanga, Uno "Kanana" Shaanika, Sackeus "Kapuleko" Kapulwa, John Karahani, Joao Shoopala , Manuel "Kalunga Kondjaba", Jonas "Katengela" Kataleonga, Jason Kaudeko and Amwaama Akapandi. This group crossed into Angola from Zambia. The group was given instruction to avoid Portuguese forces if possible and to not involve itself in the domestic squabbles of UNITA, MPLA & FNLA with their final destination being Oshimholo, Southern Angola. He was then appointed the Commander of the Northern Front in 1977 after the first military council meeting at Efitu. In the 1980s he was recalled from the front and sent for studies, eventually ending up at the United Nations Institute for Namibia in Zambia.

NDF career 
His career in a Namibian Defence Force began in 1990 and he was given the rank of Warrant Officer and later being commissioned as an officer and retired with the rank of colonel.

Honours and decorations
 Most distinguished order of Namibia-First Class
  Namibian Army Pioneer Medal.
  NDF Commendation Medal

Death
Colonel Zulu Nandenga died on 11 April 2021 and was accorded a state funeral. He was laid to rest at Eenhana memorial shrine on 24 April 2021.

References

1943 births
2021 deaths
People's Liberation Army of Namibia personnel
Namibian military personnel
People from Oshikoto Region